Bishop of Lancaster may refer to:
The Anglican Bishop of Lancaster (a suffragan bishop in the Diocese of Blackburn)
The Roman Catholic Bishop of Lancaster (the ordinary of the Roman Catholic Diocese of Lancaster)